Rod Smith (born January 10, 1992) is an American football running back for the Vegas Vipers of the XFL. He was signed by the Seattle Seahawks as an undrafted free agent in 2015. He played college football at Ohio State.

Early years
Smith attended Paul Harding High School, where he received All-state and player of the year honors as a senior. He graduated after rushing 1,000 times for a SAC conference career rushing record of 6,625 yards and 66 touchdowns.

As a senior, he also was an All-conference basketball player and was a part of the state's runner-up 4 × 100 metres relay team.

College career
Smith accepted a football scholarship from Ohio State University as a highly rated recruit. As a redshirt freshman, he appeared in 10 games, opening the season against the University of Akron with 18 carries for 74 yards and one touchdown. The next week against the University of Toledo he started to show a fumble problem, diminishing the coaching staff confidence in him. His production was limited the rest of the season behind Dan Herron, Carlos Hyde and Jordan Hall. He registered 29 carries for 116 yards and one touchdown, while playing mainly on special teams. He was also suspended after missing the team flight to the 2012 Gator Bowl.

As a sophomore, he was a backup behind Hyde and Jordan, appearing in 12 games with 32 carries for 215 yards and two touchdowns. He led the team in kickoff returns (13), total return yards (303) and return average (23.3). His best game came against Penn State University, tallying 4 carries for 48 yards.

As a junior, he was suspended for an undisclosed offseason incident for the season opener against the University at Buffalo. He fell back in the running back rotation behind Hyde, Jordan, Dontre Wilson and Ezekiel Elliott. He recorded 22 carries for 117 yards (5.3-yard average) and one touchdown.

As a senior, he missed most of spring camp for academic reasons. He still emerged as the team's goal line running back behind sophomore starter Elliott, posting 24 carries for 101 yards and 4 touchdowns, while also contributing on special teams. On October 27, he was dismissed from the football team after a failed drug test and decided to declare for the NFL Draft. He finished his college career with 549 rushing yards on 107 carries with ten touchdowns.

Professional career

Seattle Seahawks
Smith was signed as an undrafted free agent by the Seattle Seahawks after the 2015 NFL Draft on May 2. He was waived on September 5 and signed to the practice squad the next day.

On October 10, he was promoted to the active roster to provide depth while running backs Marshawn Lynch and Fred Jackson recovered from injuries. He played in one game against the Cincinnati Bengals, rushing for five yards on two carries. He was released on October 13.

Dallas Cowboys

2015 season
On October 14, 2015, he was claimed off waivers by the Dallas Cowboys. He became the third-string running back after Joseph Randle was released on November 3. He appeared in 10 games, playing mainly on special teams and having one kickoff return for 26 yards.

2016 season
In 2016, Smith was moved to fullback during OTAs, although he did not have the traditional size and body. He competed with converted linebacker Keith Smith for the position and both made the team, although Rod was used only for special teams purposes. On November 3, after injuries to Morris Claiborne and Barry Church, the Cowboys were forced to release him to make room for cornerback Leon McFadden. Smith was re-signed to the practice squad two days later. At the time, he was tied for second on the team with four special teams tackles.

2017 season

Smith signed a reserve/future contract with the Cowboys on January 16, 2017. In 2017, he returned to running back behind Ezekiel Elliott, Alfred Morris, and Darren McFadden. During the preseason, he was moved up to third-string because of his improved play and production on special teams. On September 17, in week 2 against the Denver Broncos, Smith had his first two carries with the Cowboys, which went for eight yards during a 42–17 defeat.

When Elliott was suspended for six games for violating the league's personal conduct policy, Smith ended up earning more playing time behind Alfred Morris. On Thanksgiving Day against the Los Angeles Chargers, Smith scored his first professional touchdown on a 2-yard rush. He finished the game with 41 rushing yards, a rushing touchdown, and seven receiving yards. During Week 13 against the Washington Redskins, Smith ran for 27 yards and a touchdown as the Cowboys won by a score of 38–14.

In the next game against the New York Giants, Smith had 47 rushing yards and a touchdown along with 113 receiving yards, including an 81-yard touchdown reception, helping secure a 30–10 win. In Week 15 against the Oakland Raiders, Smith rushed for 13 yards and a touchdown as the Cowboys narrowly won by a score of 20–17.

When Elliott returned from his suspension in Week 16 against the Seattle Seahawks, Smith's productivity dropped since he only rushed for 10 yards in that game. He was declared inactive for the last game against the Philadelphia Eagles, after battling an illness and a sore back. Smith finished the season with 55 carries for 232 yards, 4 rushing touchdowns, 19 receptions, 202 receiving yards, one receiving touchdown and 5 special teams tackles (tied for fifth on the team).

2018 season
Smith wasn't a factor on offense as the backup running back, but maintained his role as a core special teams player. His most action on offense came in the season finale against the New York Giants, registering 12 carries for 35 yards and one touchdown, when starter Ezekiel Elliott sat out to rest for the playoffs. His numbers decreased from the previous season to 44 carries for 127 yards and one touchdown. He was second on the team with 10 special teams tackles.

New York Giants
On May 8, 2019, Smith signed with the New York Giants. He was placed on injured reserve with an adductor injury on August 31, 2019. He was released from injured reserve with an injury settlement on September 10.

Tennessee Titans
On October 8, 2019, Smith signed with the Tennessee Titans. He appeared in 3 games and was declared inactive in 2 contests, playing only on special teams and had one tackle. He was released on November 12.

Oakland Raiders
On December 10, 2019, Smith was signed by the Oakland Raiders, reuniting with special teams coordinator Rich Bisaccia, who served in the same role with the Cowboys. He appeared in 3 games, playing only on special teams and had 2 tackles.

On March 25, 2020, Smith was re-signed to a one-year contract. He was placed on the reserve/COVID-19 list by the team on August 6, 2020. He was activated from the list on August 18. He was released on September 1, 2020.

New York Giants (second stint)
On September 8, 2020, Smith was signed to the New York Giants practice squad, reuniting with offensive coordinator Jason Garrett, who was his head coach with the Cowboys. On September 29, 2020, Smith was released from the Giants practice squad, to make room for another former Cowboys running back (Alfred Morris).

Carolina Panthers 
On August 5, 2021, Smith was signed by the Carolina Panthers. He was released on August 17, 2021.

Vegas Vipers 
On November 17th, 2022, Rod Smith was revealed to be drafted by the Vipers during the XFL Draft open phase.

NFL career statistics

Regular season

Postseason

Personal life
Smith's younger brother, Jaylon, is a linebacker for the New York Giants. Rod also played for the Giants in 2019.

References

1992 births
Living people
Players of American football from Fort Wayne, Indiana
American football running backs
Ohio State Buckeyes football players
Seattle Seahawks players
Dallas Cowboys players
New York Giants players
Tennessee Titans players
Oakland Raiders players
Las Vegas Raiders players
Carolina Panthers players
Vegas Vipers players